Messeis is a genus of planthoppers belonging to the family Achilidae.

Species:

Messeis elidipteroides 
Messeis fuscovaria

References

Achilidae